"Signal 30" is the fifth episode of the fifth season of the American television drama series Mad Men and the 57th episode of the series overall. It was written by series creator and executive producer Matthew Weiner and writer Frank Pierson, and directed by main cast member John Slattery. It originally aired on the AMC channel in the United States on April 15, 2012.

The episode takes place between July 1966 and August 1966, with references to the 1966 World Cup Final, the Charles Whitman shooting rampage, and the crash of Braniff Flight 250. Business and pleasure converge on each other at both a dinner party thrown by the Campbells and a misguided whorehouse visit intended to woo a client. Pete discovers that Ken is writing science fiction under a pseudonym, which angers Roger Sterling. Pete's emasculation continues after a routine office meeting ends in fisticuffs.

The episode's title is derived from the infamous 1959 driving safety film of the same name, which Pete Campbell is required to watch as part of his driver's education class.  The film, shown widely to high school students across the country during the 1960s, was produced by the Ohio State Highway Patrol and takes its name from the police radio code used by that agency for a fatal traffic accident.

"Signal 30" received 2.69 million viewers and a 1.0 in the coveted 18-49 demographic. It was met with rave reviews, with many commentators calling it the best episode of the season so far. Critics commended John Slattery for his directing work. Matthew Weiner and his Academy Award-winning co-writer Frank Pierson were also praised for the symbolism of the leaking tap and the character study of Pete Campbell.

Plot
Pete is being kept awake by a leaking tap in the kitchen. He eventually goes to fix it, doing so effectively and with self-satisfaction. He is later shown attending a driver's education class, where he flirts with a teenage girl about to go off to college.

Ken Cosgrove has continued his writing and runs into Peggy while meeting with a publisher over lunch. He is secretive about his work and attempts to politely get rid of her. Peggy is unsettled by this, until Ken later explains his actions in the office. Following a drunken celebration at a bar with other expatriates over England's 1966 World Cup victory, Lane excitedly tells the other SCDP partners that he has arranged a lunch meeting with a fellow Englishman, Edwin Baker, over possible representation for Jaguar Cars in America.

The Campbells throw a dinner party for the Cosgroves and the Drapers at their home. As the night progresses, Ken's writing career is accidentally brought up in conversation by his wife, leading to a retelling of one of his stories. The guests are unsure of how to react to the science fiction plot, apart from Don, who asks questions about the character.  When Don learns of Ken's writing success he is supportive of it; in contrast, Pete denigrates it.  Afterwards, the wives retreat to the kitchen, where the tap Pete previously "fixed" bursts, spraying water everywhere. Pete rushes away to get his toolbox, but by the time he returns, Don has already fixed it, explaining that Pete's previous fix was merely a coincidence.

Pete returns to his driver's ed class to find that a new student, Hanson (nicknamed "handsome"), has the attention of the girl Pete previously flirted with.

Roger advises Lane about how to ensnare a client at dinner. Roger informs Lane to find the man's source of regret, and make it relatable to himself, forming a "conspiracy" of feeling between the pair. Pryce's dinner does not go smoothly; the Jaguar representative appears to have no regrets in his life, and Lane is forced to plan another lunch to try again at confirming the new business. Upon hearing of this failure, Pete tactfully tells Lane to maintain a friendly relationship with the target, and to let Accounts take the business from there. Roger compliments Pete's letting Lane down softly and taking the task off his hands, forming a renewed alliance with Pete. At the dinner meeting, Edwin, the Jaguar representative, assures Don, Roger, and Pete they have his business, but he wants to have some fun. The executives quickly learn what kind of fun Edwin has in mind and they visit a local brothel, where Edwin, Roger, and Pete all cheat on their wives, leaving Don at the bar. Don later shares a cab with Pete on the way home in which the latter, drunk, criticizes Don as hypocritical for judging Pete's adulterous actions. Don explains he is not judging; he merely didn't know Pete was miserable. Pete replies sarcastically that he has everything, and Don warns him not to throw it away.

The next day, Roger calls Ken into his office and bluntly tells Ken to stop writing in his spare time, as he should not be diverting any attention from his job. Roger attempts to create a bond between them, stating they are both "unappreciated authors" (referencing the autobiography Roger was dictating in Season 4), but Ken has none of it.

Later that day, Lane storms into a partners' meeting, shouting at Pete about how Edwin's wife has found out about Edwin's adultery and is devastated; Edwin has withdrawn his business as a result. Lane blames Pete's methods for losing the account, and Pete responds by citing Lane's redundant role at the firm and challenging his sexuality. To the surprise and shock of the other partners, Lane responds by challenging Pete to a fistfight. Pete and Lane exchange blows until Lane wins, leaving a bloodied Pete on the office floor. Bruised, shaken, and humiliated, Pete retreats to his office. Joan goes to comfort Lane, only Lane misinterprets her affection as romantic and kisses her. Joan, startled, stands and opens the door, but does not leave. She instead stays with Lane and forgives his blunder, claiming that he'd done to Pete what everyone in the office had wanted to do for some time.

Peggy, excitedly, tells Ken about Lane's beating up Pete. Ken takes pleasure in this, and then tells Peggy about his conversation with Roger. Ken suspects Pete informed Roger, after learning about his publishing deal during the dinner party.

Later, Pete talks about his despair at the day's events with Don in the elevator, wondering how the fight occurred, when he thought they were all friends. Close to tears, he blurts out that he has nothing. Don doesn't respond.

The episode ends with Ken writing about a character whose situation reflects Pete's. Pete is shown back in his driver's ed class, watching helplessly as Hanson effortlessly seduces the girl Pete had his eyes on, while the dripping sound of the leaky tap replays in his mind.

Production
Creator Matthew Weiner co-wrote the episode with 86-year-old veteran screenwriter and Academy Award winner (for Dog Day Afternoon) Frank Pierson. Pierson offered Weiner his writing services back in 2009, leading him to serve as a consulting producer on the third season. About Pierson, Weiner said, "He's now in the writer's room. Arguably one of the greatest living writers. It means you're doing something right." Cast member John Slattery, who portrays Roger Sterling on the series, directed the episode, the third time he has directed for the series.

Weiner stated that the episode was about the question -- "What do you want?" and "Do you ever get a chance to have it?", as well as the "tentative nature of business friendships". He used Lane's friendship with the Jaguar executive and the dinner at Pete Campbell's house as examples. Vincent Kartheiser reasoned that Pete invited them over to show off his wife, home, and success. Jon Hamm elaborated on Don's reluctance to go as his desire to keep his relationship separate from the poisonous influence of Sterling Cooper Draper Pryce.

Jon Hamm pointed to Don's bad history with whorehouses as to his reluctance to take part in the festivities, while noting that "Pete has no such problem." Of Pete's scene with the prostitute, Weiner said, "You see what his fantasy is. You see his powerlessness" and that Pete is "trying to keep his life exciting". Due to the desperation and unhappiness inherent in Pete Campbell's character as demonstrated in this episode, Weiner called it "probably the saddest episode we've ever had."

The fight scene, according to Jared Harris, was Lane discovering what Pete really thought of him. Harris saw the boxing match as "a mix of so many different styles" with Lane carrying an "old school and traditional" stance. Harris saw it as Lane getting a chance to "fight for his dignity".

Reception

Ratings
"Signal 30" was watched by 2.69 million viewers and obtained a 1.0 adults 18-49 rating, a slight drop from the previous episode.

Critical reception
The episode opened to laudatory reviews from the television critic community, with much praise reserved for John Slattery's direction and the acting work of Vincent Kartheiser. Emily St. James of The A.V. Club gave the episode an A, her highest grade for the season so far, calling it "transfixing and incredible" and "season five's first instant classic". She praised the symbol of the dripping tap as well as the editing choices that suggested "the way that time passes, so that it almost seems as if you’ve lost yourself in the mists of your own life". Alan Sepinwall, writing for HitFix, exalted Slattery's "strong command of the comedic moments", and recognized that "most of the carnage" of the episode "comes out of failed attempts by Pete, Lane and Ken to be more than they are by building bridges from one world to another."

Meredith Blake, reviewer for the Los Angeles Times, said that the episode was a sort of masculine companion piece to the fourth season episode "The Beautiful Girls", as "Signal 30" focuses on "collective identity crisis of the agency's male population". Paste magazine writer Bonnie Stiernberg called Pete Campbell "one of the most complex, underrated characters on TV today" and called the dripping sink "more like a fucking geyser in reality, and if he doesn’t do something to plug it up soon, he’s going to drown." Jordan Bartel of the Chicago Tribune called the episode "a classic" and saw a possible Emmy nomination for Vincent Kartheiser, but felt the kitchen sink symbolism and ending voiceover was a little heavyhanded. Maureen Ryan of The Huffington Post praised Lane's character and Slattery's direction during the fight sequence, singling out Don, Bert, and Roger's reactions as "absolute comedy gold". She also compared the Pete character to former U.S. President Richard Nixon because: "there's a sense with Pete that there's always a chip on his shoulder and he'll eternally feel misunderstood and undervalued. He'll always inspire a mixture of pity and exasperation, because he's smart and insightful, but he can be a piece of work."

References

External links
"Signal 30" at AMC

2012 American television episodes
Mad Men (season 5) episodes